Baba Gerd Ali (also Romanized as Bābā Gerd ‘Alī; also known as Bābā Kord ‘Alī) is a village in Kunani Rural District, Kunani District, Kuhdasht County, Lorestan Province, Iran. At the 2006 census, its population was 1,394, in 304 families.

References 

Towns and villages in Kuhdasht County